This is a list of French television related events from 2014.

Events
26 January - Twin Twin are selected to represent France at the 2014 Eurovision Song Contest with their song "Moustache". They are selected to be the fifty-seventh French Eurovision entry during a national final held at the France 3 Studios in Paris.
20 February - Mathieu Saikaly wins the tenth series of Nouvelle Star.
10 May - Kendji Girac wins the third series of The Voice: la plus belle voix.
20 September - 10-year-old Carla wins the first series of The Voice Kids.
26 September - Leila Ben Khalifa wins the eighth series of Secret Story.
29 November - Pep's actor Rayane Bensetti and his partner Denitsa Ikonomova win the fifth series of Danse avec les stars.

Debuts

Television shows

1940s
Le Jour du Seigneur (1949–present)

1950s
Présence protestante (1955-)

1970s
30 millions d'amis (1976-2016)

2000s
Nouvelle Star (2003-2010, 2012–present)
Plus belle la vie (2004–present)
La France a un incroyable talent (2006–present)
Secret Story (2007–present)

2010s
Danse avec les stars (2011–present)
The Voice: la plus belle voix (2012–present)

Ending this year

Yakari

Deaths

See also
2014 in France

References